Ala (also Romanized as ‘Alā, ‘Alā’, and ‘Allā; also known as Kalāt) is a village in Howmeh Rural District, in the Central District of Semnan County, Semnan Province, Iran. At the 2006 census, its population was 1,303, in 349 families.

References 

Populated places in Semnan County